No Tomorrow is an American romantic comedy-drama television series that aired on The CW from October 4, 2016 to January 17, 2017. The series was developed by Corinne Brinkerhoff. It is based on the 2012 Brazilian series Como Aproveitar o Fim do Mundo (How to Enjoy the End of the World), which aired on Rede Globo in 2012. The show was filmed in Vancouver, British Columbia, Canada. No Tomorrow was canceled on May 8, 2017; five days later, an epilogue to the series was released.

Plot
The series follows a woman who lives in Seattle and becomes involved with a free-spirited man who inspires her to make an "apocalyst", a list of things to do before the world ends—which he claims will be in eight months and twelve days. With the help of her friends, they try to find out if he can be taken seriously while completing the bucket list.

Cast and characters

Main
 Tori Anderson as Evie Covington, a bored middle-manager employed in a supply warehouse who pushes herself into Xavier's carefree world.
 Joshua Sasse as Xavier Holliday, an eccentric, free-spirited individual who believes that the world will come to an end in eight months and plots to live life as fully as he can.
 Jonathan Langdon as Hank Barkley, Evie's cheerful co-worker.
 Sarayu Blue as Kareema, Evie's grumpy and cynical co-worker.
 Jesse Rath as Timothy Finger, Evie's former boyfriend.
 Amy Pietz as Deirdre Hackmeyer, Evie's shallow boss.

Recurring
 George Basil as Jesse, Xavier's cousin.
 Ted McGinley as Gary, Evie's father.
 Kelly Stables as Mary Anne, Evie's older sister.
 Gigi Rice as Gloria, Evie's mother.
 Vinny Chhibber as Rohan, Kareema's brother.

Episodes

On May 13, 2017, The CW released an epilogue to the series to provide closure after its cancellation.

Reception

Critical reception
No Tomorrow received generally positive reviews from television critics. On Rotten Tomatoes the season has a rating of 91%. The site's critical consensus reads, "No Tomorrow is a gentle, easy to digest rom-com that serves up a strong supporting cast, charming lead performances, and a hefty dose of fun." On Metacritic, the season has a score of 69 out of 100, based on 23 critics.

The editors of TV Guide placed No Tomorrow eighth among the top ten picks for the most anticipated new shows of the 2016–2017 season. In its review, Sadie Gennis wrote "Tori Anderson and Joshua Sasse are infectiously charming in this offbeat romantic comedy about a woman who discovers that her dream man is an apocalypse truther. It's a weird premise, sure, but No Tomorrow leans into its own absurdity, populating the show with surreal, strange characters (including one who speaks so quietly he needs subtitles) and delightful prop comedy that is rarely seen in one-hour shows. And while it's unlikely that No Tomorrow will help the CW continue its Golden Globes streak, it fits in perfectly on the network alongside fellow genre-pushing rom-coms Jane the Virgin and Crazy Ex-Girlfriend."

Ratings

References

External links
 
 
 

2010s American comedy-drama television series
2010s American comic science fiction television series
2016 American television series debuts
2017 American television series endings
American fantasy television series
American television series based on Brazilian television series
Apocalyptic television series
The CW original programming
Romantic fantasy television series
Television series by CBS Studios
Television series by Warner Bros. Television Studios
Television shows set in Seattle
American fantasy drama television series
Television shows filmed in Vancouver